Sir William Stewart (c.1440–c.1500), 2nd Laird of Baldorran, 1st Royal Bailie of the Crown lands of Balquhidder, was a fifteenth-century Scottish landowner, and founder of the Balquhidder Stewart clan. He was the grandson of James Mhor Stewart who launched a failed bid for the Crown of Scotland in 1429.

Early life
William Stewart was born in around 1440, the son of James "Beag" Stewart (c.1410–1470) and Annabel Buchanan, daughter of Patrick, 14th Lord of Buchanan,

His grandfather was James Mhor Stewart, the only son of Murdoch Stewart, Duke of Albany, to survive the persecution of King James I of Scotland in 1425. Albany was executed by James for treason in 1425 along with his eldest sons, and his estates forfeited. James Mhor Stewart fled to Antrim, Ireland to escape the King's vengeance. His youngest son James "Beag" Stewart was able to secure a royal pardon and return to Scotland, where he married Annabel Buchanan, daughter of Patrick, 14th Lord of Buchanan, and was granted the estate of Baldorran. William Stewart was their second son.

Bailie of the Crown Lands of Balquhidder

In or around 1488 William Stewart of Baldorran was appointed Royal Bailie of the Crown Lands of Balquhidder. A baillie (alternative spelling bailie, from Old French) was a local civic officer in Scottish burghs, approximately equivalent to the post of alderman or magistrate (see bailiff) in other countries. They were responsible for a jurisdiction called a bailiary (alt. bailiery). Scottish barons often appointed a Baillie as their judicial officer.

William brought the Stewart name to Balquhidder and was the founder of the Balquhidder Stewart clan. The Stewarts of Ardvorlich, Glen Buckie, Gartnafuaran and Annat and their cadet families are all descended from him.

The name Baldorran is derived from the Gaelic, baille nan dobhran, meaning "town of the otter". It is sometimes spelled using the archaic form of "Balindoran". In any event Baldorran no longer exists. It was located in East Dunbartonshire, near Milton of Campsie, approximately 15 miles southwest of Stirling. The Stewarts of Baldorran sold Baldorran to the Glorat family, and today maps show the former residence of Baldorran as Glorat House.

William Stewart did much to restore prosperity to his family, ruined by the events of 1425 and the execution of his great-grandfather the Duke of Albany. He succeeded in expanding the family estates, adding parts of Upper Strathgartney and eventually most of Balquhidder.

Family
Stewart married twice. His first wife was Janet Buchanan, daughter of Archibald Buchanan of Lettir (in Strathyre). They had two children:

 Janet Stewart (born c1475).
 Agnes Stewart (born c1477).

His second wife was Marion Helen Campbell, Of Glenorchy, daughter of Colin Campbell, 1st of Glenorchy, whom he married on 5 October 1498, and by whom he had three children:

 Walter Stewart, 3rd Laird of Baldorran, 2nd Bailie of Balquhidder, born c1480 in Baldorran, Campsie, Stirlingshire.
 John Stewart, 1st Laird of Glenbuckie, born c1485 in Baldorran, Campsie, Stirlingshire.
 Mariote Stewart, born c1490 in Baldorran, Campsie, Stirlingshire, Scotland.

In the portioning of Balquhidder which took place during the sixteenth century, the descendants of Sir William Stewart of Baldorran gained hereditary tacks of land.

Ancestry

See also
 Stewart of Balquhidder

References
 Campbell, Alastair, p.134, A History of Clan Campbell Retrieved November 2010
 Debrett, John, p.799, Debrett's Peerage of England, Scotland, and Ireland Retrieved November 2010
 Nelker, Gladys P, The Clan Steuart, Genealogical Publishing (1970)
 Seaver, Montgomery J., p. 11, Stewart Family History Retrieved November 2010

External links
 Descendants of the Duke of Albany at www.chuckspeed.com Retrieved November 2010
 Stewarts of Balquhidder webpage Retrieved November 2010

Notes

Medieval Gaels from Scotland
Scottish businesspeople
15th-century Scottish people
People from Stirling (council area)
Scottish landowners
William
1440 births
1500 deaths